Amalia Georgievna von Mengden (1799-1864), was a Russian entrepreneur. She was one of the first female textile industrialists in Russia. She was married to General baron Mikhail von Mengden. She managed the Mengden tablecloth factory in Saint Nicholas in the Kostroma Governorate in 1830-1864.

References
   Отрывки семейной хроники  (из воспоминаний баронессы Софии Менгден), в журнале «Русская старина», 1908, апрель, стр. 99.
   Фабрика в 1843 году в  Исследованиях о состоянии льняной промышленности в России. СПб, 1847

1799 births
1864 deaths
19th-century businesspeople from the Russian Empire
Russian women in business
People from Vichuga
People from the Russian Empire of German descent
Amalia von Mengden